Barry Altschul (born January 6, 1943, New York City) is a free jazz and hard bop drummer who first came to notice in the late 1960s for performing with pianists Paul Bley and Chick Corea.

Biography
Altschul is of Russian Jewish heritage, the son of a laborer who did construction work and drove a taxi. Having initially taught himself to play drums, Altschul studied with Charlie Persip during the 1960s. In the latter part of the decade, he performed with Paul Bley. In 1969 he joined with Chick Corea, Dave Holland and Anthony Braxton to form the group Circle. At the time, he made use of a high-pitched Gretsch kit with add-on drums and percussion instruments.

In the 1970s, Altschul worked extensively with Anthony Braxton's quartet featuring Kenny Wheeler, Dave Holland, and George E. Lewis. Braxton, signed to Arista Records, was able to secure a large enough budget to tour with a collection of dozens of percussion instruments, strings and winds.  In addition to his participation in ensembles featuring avant-garde musicians, Altschul performed with Lee Konitz, Art Pepper and other "straight ahead" jazz performers.

Altschul also made albums as a leader, but after the mid-1980s he was rarely seen in concert or on record, spending much of his time in Europe.  Since the 2000s, he has become more visible, with two sideman appearances on the CIMP label with the FAB trio (with Billy Bang and Joe Fonda), the Jon Irabagon Trio recording "Foxy", and the bassist Adam Lane.  Altschul has played or recorded with many musicians, including Roswell Rudd, Dave Liebman, Barre Phillips, Denis Levaillant, Andrew Hill, Sonny Criss, Hampton Hawes, and Lee Konitz.

Discography

As leader/co-leader
 1967: Virtuosi (Improvising Artists) with Paul Bley and Gary Peacock
 1977: You Can't Name Your Own Tune (32 Jazz)
 1978: Another Time/Another Place (Muse)
 1979: For Stu (Soul Note)
 1979: Somewhere Else (Moers Music)
 1979: Be-Bop? (Musica) with Pepper Adams
 1980: Brahma (Sackville)
 1983: Irina (Soul Note)
 1986: That's Nice (Soul Note)
 2003: Transforming the Space
 2012: Reunion: Live in New York (Pi)
 2013: The 3Dom Factor (TUM)
 2015: Tales of the Unforeseen (TUM)

As sideman
With Paul Bley
 Touching (Debut, 1965)
 Closer (ESP-Disk, 1966)
 Ramblin' (BYG Actuel, 1967)
 Blood (Fontana, 1966)
 In Haarlem - Blood (Freedom, 1967)
 Ballads (ECM, 1967 [1971])
 Paul Bley & Scorpio (Milestone, 1973)
 Japan Suite (Improvising Artists, 1977)
 Hot (Soul Note, 1985)
 Live at Sweet Basil (Soul Note, 1988)
 Indian Summer (SteepleChase, 1987)
 Rejoicing (SteepleChase, 1989)

With Anthony Braxton
 The Complete Braxton (Freedom, 1971 [1973])
 Town Hall 1972 (Trio, 1972)
 Quartet: Live at Moers Festival (Ring, 1974 [1976])
 Five Pieces 1975 (Arista, 1975)
 Creative Orchestra Music 1976 (Arista, 1976)
 Dortmund (Quartet) 1976 (hatART, 1976 [1991])
 The Montreux/Berlin Concerts (Arista, 1975–76)

With Chick Corea
 The Song of Singing (1971)
 Circling In (1975)
 ARC (ECM, 1971)
 Circulus (1970)
 Paris Concert (ECM, 1971)
 The Beginning (1996)

With Annette Peacock
 1972 I'm the One
 2014 I Belong to a World That's Destroying Itself [aka Revenge]

With Sam Rivers
 1973 Hues (Impulse!)
 1975 Sizzle (Impulse!)
 1976 The Quest (Red)
 1977 Paragon

With others
 1972 Hold That Plane!, Buddy Guy
 1972 Play the Blues, Buddy Guy/Junior Wells
 1973 Conference of the Birds, Dave Holland (ECM)
 1973 Icarus, Paul Winter
 1974 Drum Ode, Dave Liebman
 1974 Flexible Flyer, Roswell Rudd
 1975 Coon Bid'ness, Julius Hemphill
 1975 Spiral, Andrew Hill
 1982 Give and Take, John Lindberg (Black Saint) 
 1983 And Far Away Kenny Drew (Soul Note) 
 1983 Lido, Claudio Fasoli
 1983 My One and Only Love, Franco D'Andrea
 1983 No Idea of Time, Franco D'Andrea
 1983 Sounds of Love, Tiziana Ghiglioni
 1986 Passages, Denis Levaillant (DLM, 1986/2012)
 1990 Brundl's Basslab, Manfred Brundl
 1991 For All the Marbles Suite, Simon Nabatov
 1992 Giacobazzi: Autour de la Rade, André Jaume
 1995 Live, Brundl's Basslab
 1995 Reflections, Julius Hemphill
 1997 Kinshasa-Washington D.C.-Paris, Ray Lema
 1999 Clarinet Sessions, André Jaume
 2000 Another Side, Ken Simon
 2001 Skillfullness, Alan Silva
 2002 Four Beings, Adam Lane
 2003 Transforming the Space, FAB Trio
 2004 Desert Songs & Other Landscapes, Gebhard Ullmann
 2005 Flat Fleet, Enrico Rava
 2009 Live in Amsterdam, FAB Trio
 2009 Trombone Tribe, Roswell Rudd
 2010 News? No News!, Gebhard Ullmann-Steve Swell Quartet

References

External links
[ Allmusic.com biography]

1943 births
Living people
American jazz drummers
Musicians from New York City
Musicians from New York (state)
Muse Records artists
20th-century American drummers
American male drummers
Circle (jazz band) members
Jazz musicians from New York (state)
20th-century American male musicians
American male jazz musicians
21st-century American drummers
Sackville Records artists
Improvising Artists Records artists
21st-century American male musicians
American people of Russian-Jewish descent
Jewish jazz musicians